Roger William Jepsen (December 23, 1928 – November 13, 2020) was an American politician from the state of Iowa. A Republican, he served in the United States Senate and as Lieutenant Governor of Iowa.

Early life 
Jepsen was born on December 23, 1928 in Cedar Falls, Iowa, the son of Emil and Esther (Sorensen) Jepsen. His grandparents were all Danish immigrants. Jepsen attended public schools.

Education 
Jepsen attended University of Northern Iowa. Jepsen graduated from Arizona State University in Tempe, Arizona in 1950 with a bachelor's degree and in 1953 with a master's degree. At ASU, Jepsen was a member of the Tau Kappa Epsilon.

Career
Jepsen became a paratrooper in the United States Army 1946–1947 and served in the United States Army Reserve 1948–1960, where he achieved the rank of captain. He was active in farming, insurance and health care businesses.

Jepsen served as a county supervisor of Scott County from 1962 to 1965 and was a state Senator from 1966 to 1968. He was the 39th Lieutenant Governor of Iowa from 1969 to 1973, having been elected with Governor Robert D. Ray in 1968.

In 1978, he was elected to the United States Senate, narrowly defeating incumbent Dick Clark in a major surprise, receiving strong support from National Conservative Political Action Committee (NCPAC). During the campaign, Jepsen taunted Senator Clark as "the Senator from Africa" because of Clark's work on behalf of South African people against their apartheid government. He served a single term from January 3, 1979 to January 3, 1985. He served as co-chairman of the Joint Economic Committee in the 98th Congress.

Fellow Republican colleagues praised Jepsen for persuading then U.S. President Ronald Reagan to lift the agricultural ban against the Soviet Union.

Jepsen was defeated by Democratic Congressman Tom Harkin in the 1984 Senate election. 
Jepsen later served as chairman of the National Credit Union Administration.

During part of his tenure in the Senate, Jepsen sat at the Candy Desk.

Death

Jepsen died on November 13, 2020, at the Clarissa C. Cook Hospice House in Bettendorf, Iowa, aged 91. He was buried in Davenport Memorial Park in Davenport, Iowa.

References

External links
Obituary

1928 births
2020 deaths
Businesspeople from Iowa
Farmers from Iowa
University of Northern Iowa alumni
Arizona State University alumni
Republican Party Iowa state senators
Politicians from Alexandria, Virginia
United States Army officers
Republican Party United States senators from Iowa
People from Cedar Falls, Iowa
Military personnel from Iowa
County supervisors in Iowa
United States Army reservists
Politicians from Davenport, Iowa
Lieutenant Governors of Iowa